Dennis Chinnery (14 May 1927 – 29 February 2012) was a British actor, noted for his performances in television.

Following National service in the navy, he studied acting at RADA, graduating in 1949. His theatre work included appearances at the Old Vic.

His TV credits include: Hancock's Half Hour, Dixon of Dock Green, Z-Cars, Softly, Softly, The Saint, The Avengers, The Prisoner, The Champions, Public Eye, Special Branch, Oh Brother!, The Laughter of a Fool, Thriller and Survivors.

He also appeared in three Doctor Who serials - The Chase, Genesis of the Daleks and The Twin Dilemma. The character Dr Chinnery in The League of Gentlemen was named after him.
He was born at Romford, Essex, to Arthur F Chinnery and his wife Dorothy (née Mills).

Chinnery was also an artist and painter.

Partial filmography
 Three Steps to the Gallows (1953) - Bill Adams, 2nd Officer
 Escape by Night (1953) - Reporter (uncredited)
 The Embezzler (1954) - Bank Clerk
 Delayed Action (1954) - Bank cashier
 Hour of Decision (1957) - Studio Photographer
 The Plague of the Zombies (1966) - Constable Christian
 The Body Stealers (1969) - 1st Control Officer
 Crossplot (1969) - First reporter
 All the Way Up (1970) - Makepiece's Chauffeur
 Percy (1971) - Newsreader (uncredited)
 Bullseye! (1990) - 2nd Vault Guard

References

Obituary with the correct date of birth

External links
 

1927 births
2012 deaths
Alumni of RADA
English male television actors